Nausigaster punctulata is a species of syrphid fly in the family Syrphidae.

References

Eristalinae
Eumerini
Articles created by Qbugbot
Insects described in 1883